Donji Račnik  is a village in the municipality of Jagodina, Serbia. According to the 2002 census, the village has a population of 649 people.

References

Populated places in Pomoravlje District